Runcorn Linnets F.C. are an English football club based in Runcorn, Cheshire. The club is run by a trust which is a registered society under the Co-operative and Community Benefit Societies Act 2014, and is registered with the Financial Services Authority.

History
The club was formed on 28 April 2006 as a replacement for the town's previous club, Runcorn F.C. Halton, which had resigned from the Northern Premier League due to financial difficulties. The original Runcorn club's biggest success had been winning the 1981–82 Alliance Premier League title, although they failed to reach the Football League as the league's members had voted against them joining. The club is run by the Supporters Trust, which had been set up as "The Linnets Independent Supporters Trust", and the new club joined two levels further down the football pyramid, in the North West Counties Football League Division Two, having been accepted into the league on 17 June. A groundshare with Witton Albion was arranged at the start of the 2006–07 season, until a suitable ground could be found in Runcorn. This was achieved in 2010, when the club moved into a newly built ground on Murdishaw Avenue and named it the Millbank Linnets Stadium as part of a three-year sponsorship deal.

Steve Carragher who had played for and managed Runcorn FC Halton, joined the club as manager, with Mark Philips as his assistant player-manager. Several players from the old club also joined the Linnets. Their first game was a 4–0 away win against Ashton Town, followed by a 5–0 victory at home to Castleton Gabriels. Runcorn finished their inaugural season as runners-up, losing out on the league title to Winsford United on goal difference, and won promotion to the First Division. Thomas Lamb finished the season as top scorer, with 22 goals in all competitions.

In the 2007–08 season, Linnets spent most of their time in mid-table. They won their first ever FA Vase game against Daisy Hill, before losing to Salford City in the First round. After a string of poor results, the board decided that a change of management was needed and Steve Wilkes was appointed as manager in January 2008. They finished the season twelfth out of 20 clubs. During the close season, the league was restructured with the First Division becoming the Premier Division. In the 2008–09 season Linnets entered the FA Cup for the first time, winning their first game 3–2 at home to Rossington Main on 17 August 2008. In the next round they lost 4–0 to Curzon Ashton on 30 August. Recently the club have announced a youth team in every age group up to the under 16s. In 2011–12 they were the only team from the NWCFL to get to the Second Qualifying Round of the FA Cup.

After three consecutive seasons of finishing runners-up, Runcorn finished fourth in the 2016–17 season, which was their lowest in four years. In the 2017–18 season, Runcorn Linnets finished the season in first, four points ahead of second placed Widnes, who also gained promotion. Runcorn also went on to have the highest number of goals scored and the fewest goals conceded.

Runcorn finished 4th in the 2021–22 season.  They beat Leek 4-1 in the playoff semi final.  They lost 2-1 to Marine in the playoff final with a sellout crowd of 1,600 at the APEC Taxis Stadium.

Stadium
The club used to groundshare with Witton Albion at the Wincham Park stadium in Northwich. However, they had a stated aim to move back to Runcorn with a new stadium project – R2R (Return 2 Runcorn). A working party was established to work towards the move. The club had been in discussion with Riverside College about leasing a plot of land at the Runcorn Campus, but this proposal was rejected. The next plan involved a move to Halton Sports in Murdishaw, Runcorn for the start of the 2010–11 season, and this has now been completed, largely due to the backing of the local council. The club's aims were to build a ground that would meet the Northern Premier League standard, together with a Community centre which would be used as the clubhouse on matchdays. The club also want to include an all-weather pitch on the site for use by local sporting organisations and groups.  The opening match took place on 17 July 2010 and was a friendly against Witton Albion, partly as old rivals but mainly as an appreciation of their help in establishing a base for Runcorn Linnets F.C. in its foundation years.

From the start of the 2020-21 season Runcorn Linnets will play on a state of the art hybrid grass pitch. The pitch will also enable the club to increase community engagement.

Honours

 NWCFL League Cup: Champions: 2012–13
 NWCFL Premier Division: Champions: 2017–18

Players
As of 16 September 2020.

Current squad

Non-playing staff
As of 11 January 2021.

Attendances

Averages
The average home league game attendance for the 2017–18 season was 374, placing Runcorn Linnets 1st for the division.

Past averages:
2018-19: 347
2017-18: 374
2016-17: 332
2015–16: 324
2014–15: 363
2013–14: 323
2012–13: 244
2011–12: 276
2010–11: 284
2009–10: 138
2008–09: 136
2007–08: 170
2006–07: 200

Source: Tony Kempster's site Non-League Matters NW Counties Football League site

League history

See also

 List of fan-owned sports teams

References

External links
Official website

Association football clubs established in 2006
Football clubs in Cheshire
Fan-owned football clubs in England
North West Counties Football League clubs
Runcorn
2006 establishments in England
Phoenix clubs (association football)
Football clubs in England
Northern Premier League clubs